Claritas Fossae is a densely-dissected highland terrain on the Tharsis Rise of Mars, located immediately south of the Tharsis Montes. The fossae of the Claritas Fossae region are many superposed swarms of graben.

Context

Claritas Fossae is a group of troughs in the Phoenicis Lacus and Thaumasia quadrangles of Mars, located at 
31.5 S and 104.1 W.  The structure is 2,050.0 km long and was named after a classical albedo feature name.

Geology

Long narrow depressions on Mars are called fossae. This term is derived from Latin; therefore fossa is singular and fossae is plural. Troughs form when the crust is stretched until it breaks. The stretching can be due to the large weight of a nearby volcano. Fossae/pit craters are common near volcanoes in the Tharsis and Elysium regions.  A trough often has two breaks with a middle section moving down, leaving steep cliffs along the sides; such a trough is called a graben.

Gallery

In culture 
Claritas Fossae is the setting of the short story Loyal Soldier, part of the Mars Mars 2194 by Canadian author Jack Stornoway.

See also

 Fossa (geology)
 Geology of Mars
 HiRISE
 HiWish program

References 

Phoenicis Lacus quadrangle